Nine Horrors and a Dream is a collection of fantasy and horror short stories by American writer Joseph Payne Brennan. It was released in 1958 by Arkham House in an edition of 1,336 copies.  It was the author's first collection of stories to be published.

The jacket front panel and spine give the title only as Nine Horrors, although the full title appears on the inner jacket flap and title page.

Some of the stories had originally appeared in the magazine Weird Tales and other pulps of the 1950s.  One of the stories, "Levitation", was adapted for the television series Tales from the Darkside.

"The Calamander Chest" was recorded by Vincent Price for inclusion on the Caedmon Educational Recordings release of The Goblins at the Bathhouse, 1978. The title is from the Ruth Manning-Sanders tale on side 1.

The volume was reprinted by Ballantine Books as a paperback in 1958 with a cover illustration by Richard Powers.  And again in 2019 by Dover Publications.

Contents
Nine Horrors and a Dream contains the following tales:

 "Slime"
 "Levitation"
 "The Calamander Chest"
 "Death in Peru"
 "On the Elevator"
 "The Green Parrot"
 "Canavan's Back Yard"
 "I'm Murdering Mr. Massingham"
 "The Hunt"
 "The Mail for Juniper Hill"

Sources 

1958 short story collections
Fantasy short story collections
Horror short story collections
Arkham House books